Regal Petroleum plc is a petroleum company based in London with assets in Romania, Ukraine, Greece, and Egypt. It was founded by Frank Timiş in November 1996, and is listed on the London Alternative Investment Market.

External links
Official Website

Oil and gas companies of the United Kingdom
Companies based in the City of Westminster
Energy companies established in 1996
Non-renewable resource companies established in 1996
1996 establishments in England